Skeetawk is a nonprofit ski area in the Matanuska-Susitna Borough of Alaska. The borough approved a 40-year lease for the land in 2020. Its first lift, a triple chair, became operational in June, 2020. It was named for the Athabaskan word Shk’ituk’t, meaning ‘the place where we slide down’.

References 

Ski areas and resorts in Alaska